Achim Petry (born 24 August 1974) is a German singer and musician, best known for singing in the German pop trio Trademark.

Biography 
Achim Petry is the son of the Schlager-singer Wolfgang Petry.
Back to mid-1990s, Petry was a member of a German musical group Trademark, working under the name of Achim Remling, together with two other members Mirko Bäumer and Sascha Sadeghian.  The group Trademark later dissolved in early 2000s.  Starting in 2007, Achim Petry began his solo career, with new editions of his father's old hits.

Discography

Albums 
 2007: So wie ich!
 2008: So wie ich! (Special Edition)
 2013: Mein Weg
 2014: Mittendrin

Singles 
 2007: Keiner liebt dich …
 2008: Dschungel Wahnsinn (feat. Dschungel Allstars)
 2008: Das wird 'ne lange Nacht
 2008: Wie ein Komet (Promo)
 2009: Maria Maria
 2013: Deine Liebe ist der Wahnsinn
 2013: Rosalie
 2014: Rettungsboot (feat. Wolfgang Petry)

Tour 
 2008: Der Wahnsinn geht weiter

References

External links 

 Official site of Achim Petry

German male musicians
1974 births
Living people
Musicians from Bonn